The Congressional Armenian Caucus (CAC) is an organization of over 100 members of the United States Congress. The Caucus is dedicated to keeping members of Congress engaged on Armenia-related issues as well as strengthening and maintaining the US-Armenia relationship. In particular, the Congressional Armenian Caucus aims to increase US aid to Armenia and Artsakh, recognise the Armenian genocide and to recognise the independence of Artsakh. The CAC was founded in 1995. Although the majority of the members are from the Democratic Party, there are also members from the  Republican party including Co-Chairs Gus Bilirakis and David Valadao.

Co-Chairs 

 Gus Bilirakis
 Frank Pallone
 Jackie Speier
 David Valadao

Vice-Chairs 

 Adam Schiff

Notable activities of the Congressional Armenian Caucus 
During the 2020 Nagorno-Karabakh War, members of the Congressional Armenian Caucus urged the US to recognise the independence of Artsakh and to support its right to self determination. One example is when on 22 October 2020 Frank Pallone joined by a bipartisan group of 34 Members of the House of Representatives, introduced a resolution supporting the Republic of Artsakh, recognizing its right to self-determination, and condemning Azerbaijan and Turkey for aggression.

On 13 November 2020, the Congressional Armenian Caucus calls on Biden to revise his Artsakh policy. The Congressional Armenian Caucus has called on President-Elect Joe Biden to lead U.S. re-engagement in negotiations for a lasting settlement of the Nagorno-Karabakh conflict through the OSCE Minsk Group and to stop military aid to Azerbaijan.

On 18 November 2020, the Co-Chairs of the Armenian Caucus urged the U.S. Administration to re-Engage in OSCE-Led Artsakh Peace Process (OSCE Minsk Group)

On 19 February 2021, 100 U.S. Representatives called on the Biden Administration to stand with Artsakh and Armenia in a bipartisan Congressional Armenian Caucus letter.

On 5 March 2021, A resolution submitted by the Congressional Armenian Caucus calls on Azerbaijan to immediately release all 200+ Armenian prisoners of war and captured civilians. This resolution was introduced by Adam Schiff, Gus Bilirakis, Jackie Speier, David Valadao and Frank Pallone, additionally it cites findings that Azerbaijani military forces have mistreated ethnic Armenian prisoners of war and subjected them to "physical abuse and humiliation," including beheadings, summary executions, and the desecration of human remains.

On 31 March 2021, the Congressional Armenian Caucus started collecting signatures on a letter calling for a robust Artsakh humanitarian assistance package for refugees, housing, food security, water and sanitation, healthcare, rehabilitation, and demining/UXO clearance.

On 1 April 2021, the Congressional Armenian Caucus announced that they are calling for over $100 million in U.S. aid to Armenia and Artsakh following Turkey and Azerbaijan’s devastating attacks last year, as House Appropriations Subcommittee on Foreign Operations Chairwoman Barbara Lee (D-CA) and Ranking Member Hal Rogers (R-KY) begin crafting the FY2022 Foreign Aid Bill.

Notable Members 

 Rosa DeLauro (Chair of the House Appropriations Committee)
 Adam Smith (Chair of the House Committee on Armed Services)
 Frank Pallone (Chair of the House Energy and Commerce Committee)
 Ted Deutch (Chair of the House Ethics Committee)
 Gregory Meeks (Chair of the House Foreign Affairs Committee)
 Zoe Lofgren (Chair of the House Administration Committee)
 Adam Schiff (Chair of the House Intelligence Committee)
 Raul Grijalva (Chair of the House Natural Resources Committee)
 Carolyn Maloney (Chair of the House Oversight and Reform Committee)
 Jim McGovern (Chair of the House Rules Committee)
 Eddie Bernice Johnson (Chair of the House Committee on Science, Space and Technology)
 Nydia Velazquez (Chair of the House Small Business Committee)
 Mark Takano (Chair of the House Transportation and Infrastructure Committee)
 Richard Neal (Chair of the House Ways and Means Committee)
 Ilhan Omar

List of Members 
The list of members in the Congressional Armenian Caucus can be found on the Armenian National Committee of America website, however some members of congress may be missing because the list frequently expands as more members of Congress join.

References 

Caucuses of the United States Congress
Armenian diaspora communities in the United States